Dickinson v. Zurko, 527 U.S. 150 (1999), was a United States Supreme Court case in which the Court held that appeals from the USPTO Board of Patent Appeals and Interferences are to be reviewed for whether the Board's conclusions are supported by "substantial evidence" under the APA.

The Court was asked by the United States Patent and Trademark Office to decide whether the Office's reviewing court, the Court of Appeals for the Federal Circuit, should review the agency's factual determinations for whether the Office's decisions were supported with substantial evidence (under the Administrative Procedures Act), or whether the evidence was clearly erroneous (such as how a lower court would be reviewed).  Agreeing with the PTO, the Supreme Court ruled 6-3 that the Office need only have substantial evidence.

External links
 
Final Court of Appeals opinion after Supreme Court review, In re Zurko et al, 258 F.3d 1379 (Fed. Cir. 2001)
Court of Appeals for the Federal Circuit opinion II, reversed by Supreme Court, 142 F.3d 1447 (Fed. Cir. 1998) (en banc)
Court of Appeals for the Federal Circuit panel opinion, vacated by rehearing en banc, 111 F.3d 887 (Fed. Cir. 1997)
Appendix to Dickinson brief before the Supreme Court (includes opinion of the Board of Patent Appeals and Interferences) (pp. 35a-45a)
Application status available through Public PAIR (search for application 07/479,666 or patent 6,507,909)

United States Supreme Court cases
United States patent case law
United States Patent and Trademark Office
1999 in United States case law
United States Supreme Court cases of the Rehnquist Court